Ian Russell Wallace (29 September 1946 – 22 February 2007) was an English rock and jazz drummer, most visibly as a member of progressive rock band King Crimson, as a member of David Lindley's El Rayo-X and as Don Henley's drummer.

Early years
Wallace was born in Bury and educated at Bury Grammar School. He formed his first band, The Jaguars, at school, before going on to join The Warriors with Jon Anderson in his pre-Yes days. (Wallace later played with Yes once in November 1968 during Bill Bruford's hiatus from the band).

From The Warriors, Wallace went on to join Big Sound. In the 1960s, Big Sound worked in Denmark, Norway and Sweden as a backing band of Danish rock musician Nalle. The Big Sound and The Warriors had been mates, and had gigged together in the Storyville Club, Frankfurt, Cologne and Copenhagen. The Big Sound's drummer and bass player left, after which Ian and The Warriors bass player, Dave Foster, joined the band. When the Big Sound split at the end of 1967 during a tour of Norway, some members, including Wallace, moved to London to back other artists such as Sandie Shaw, David Garrick, Marv Johnson and Lou Christie.

Prime years
Wallace later joined Vivian Stanshall's BiG GrunT, and then The World with Neil Innes before King Crimson. He appeared on the album Islands in 1971, and on the live album Earthbound in 1972, as well as a number of later archival releases. In May 1972, at the end of a U.S. tour, he and fellow Crimson members Mel Collins and Boz Burrell left the band and went to work for Alexis Korner's Snape.

Wallace subsequently worked with Steve Marriott's All-Stars and was invited to join Bob Dylan's band in 1978 and accompanied Dylan during his tour of Japan. Wallace's heavy drum style was the driving force behind the pop-heavy album Street-Legal. He toured again with Dylan in the early 1990s. In 1977 he also worked briefly with Foreigner subbing some dates after their regular drummer, Dennis Elliott, injured his hand.

Other notable work includes Ry Cooder in 1979 and Don Henley in the 1980s and 1990s. Wallace's studio and live credits also include El Rayo-X with David Lindley, Bonnie Raitt, Joe Walsh, Bob Dylan, Johnny Hallyday, Keith Emerson, Roy Orbison, Jackson Browne, the Traveling Wilburys, Eric Clapton, Jon Anderson, Alvin Lee, Crosby, Stills and Nash, the Quireboys, Larry Coryell, Stevie Nicks, Lindsey Buckingham, Steve Marriott, Al Kooper, Tim Buckley, Lonnie Mack, Procol Harum (1993 tour), and Warren Zevon.

Later years and death
Following a move to Nashville, Tennessee, in 1998, Wallace worked as a producer and player. Among his later studio recordings there were sessions with Kim Richey, Tim Krekel, Rick Vito, Dean Dillon, Rosie Flores, Jessi Alexander, producer Gary Nicholson, Steve Ripley, Jan Pulsford, Tim Hinkley, Charlie Taylor, Rodney Crowell and the legendary songwriter Dan Penn. He also performed live with T. Graham Brown, the Nashville Chamber Orchestra, Rick Vito, Jessi Alexander, and Billy Burnette, the latter in a quartet that included bassist Dave Roe (Johnny Cash) and Kenny Vaughan (Lucinda Williams).

In 2003, he joined the 21st Century Schizoid Band, and released his only solo album, Happiness With Minimal Side Effects.

In 2005 he formed the Crimson Jazz Trio with Tim Landers on bass and Jody Nardone on piano, which released King Crimson Songbook Volume One in November 2005 and King Crimson Songbook Volume Two in early 2009.

On 10 August 2006, Wallace was diagnosed with esophageal cancer. He chronicled his illness in his online blog in the hope his story would encourage others with similar symptoms to pursue treatment. He died, aged 60, with his wife, Marjorie Pomeroy, at his side.

Selected discography

The Warriors
Single :
1964: You came along/Don't make me blue – Decca Records

Albums :
2003: The Warriors : Bolton Club 1965 – VoicePrint
2003: The Warriors '65

The World
1970: The World – Lucky Planet

King Crimson
1971: Islands
1972: Earthbound
1998: Live at Jacksonville, 1972
2000: Live at Summit Studios: Denver, 03/12/1972 
2001: Live in Detroit 1971	  	
2002: Ladies of the Road	
2003: Live in Orlando, 1972
2017: Sailors' Tales 1970-1972, 27-disc boxed set

Snape
1973: Accidentally Born in New Orleans 
1974: Snape Live on Tour in Germany

David Lindley and El Rayo-X
1981: El Rayo-X
1982: Win This Record
1983: El Rayo Live
1985: Mr Dave

Johnny Hallyday
1995: Lorada 
1996: Destination Vegas
1996: Lorada Tour
2003: À La Cigale 
2003: Live at the Aladdin Theatre

The Wallace/Trainor Conspiracy
1998: Take A Train

Crimson Jazz Trio
2005: King Crimson Songbook, Volume One
2009: King Crimson Songbook, Volume Two

21st Century Schizoid Band
2006: Pictures of a City: Live in New York

Solo
2003: Happiness With Minimal Side Effects

Collaborations
1972: Billy Burnette – Billy Burnette		
1973: Jackson Heights – Bump & Grind 	 	  	
1973: Alvin Lee & Mylon LeFevre – On the Road to Freedom
1973: Esther Phillips – Black-Eyed Blues
1974: Alexis Korner – Alexis Korner
1974: Big Jim Sullivan – Big Jims Back
1974: Alvin Lee – In Flight
1975: Alvin Lee – Pump Iron!
1975: Labi Siffre – Remember My Song
1976: Steve Marriott – Marriott
1978: Bob Dylan – Street-Legal  	
1979: Bob Dylan – Bob Dylan at Budokan
1981: Ronnie Wood – 1234 	
1982: Don Henley – I Can't Stand Still
1983: Jon Anderson – Animation
1983: Stevie Nicks – The Wild Heart 	
1984: Don Henley – Building the Perfect Beast 	
1986: Graham Nash – Innocent Eyes 	
1986: Jackson Browne – Lives in the Balance	
1986: Bonnie Raitt – Nine Lives 		
1988: Traveling Wilburys – Traveling Wilburys Vol. 1
1989: Roy Orbison – Mystery Girl 	
1990: London Quireboys – A Bit of What You Fancy
1991: Jump in the Water – Jump in the Water
1995: Alvin Lee & Ten Years After – Pure Blues
1995: Joe Walsh – A Future to This Life: Robocop – The Series Soundtrack
1997: Humble Pie – The Scrubbers Sessions 
1998: Bruce Donnola - Vaudeville
2000: Billy Burnette – Are You With Me Baby	  	
2000: Alvin Lee & Ten Years After – Solid Rock
2001: Rodney Crowell – The Houston Kid
2003: Bob Dylan – Street-Legal [Remastered]
2005: Fission Trip – Fission Trip, Volume One
2005: Adrian Belew – Side One
2006: Skye Edwards – Mind How You Go
2007: Traveling Wilburys – Traveling Wilburys
2007: Steve Marriott's All Stars – Wham Bam

References

External links
 Exclusive interview with Ian Wallace
 Crimson Jazz Trio official website

1946 births
2007 deaths
English rock drummers
King Crimson members
People from Bury, Greater Manchester
Music in the Metropolitan Borough of Bury
Musicians from Manchester
Deaths from esophageal cancer
Deaths from cancer in California
Procol Harum members
English session musicians
People educated at Bury Grammar School
Progressive rock drummers
Streetwalkers members